Thorp Mill, Royton was built  by Ralph Taylor at Thorp Clough in 1764.
 This is reputed to be the first cotton mill in Lancashire to be powered by water. Ralph Taylor bought three existing cottages which he converted into a mill. This was a carding mill, and was powered by a water wheel driven from Thorp Clough, a tributary of the River Irk. The mill closed in 1788 when the mill and contents were advertised for sale by the then owner James Taylor. It was advertised again in 1792, and the buildings reverted to cottages, and were subsequently demolished. The mill is marked by a blue plaque.

Thorp itself is higher up the clough and is the oldest hamlet in Royton, Lancashire.

The construction of more mills followed, which initiated a process of urbanisation and socioeconomic transformation in the region; the population moved away from farming, adopting employment in the factory system. The introduction of which  led to a tenfold increase of Royton's population in less than a century; from 260 in 1714 to 2,719 in 1810. The introduction of textile manufacture during the Industrial Revolution facilitated a process of unplanned urbanisation in the area, and by the mid-19th century Royton had emerged as a mill town.

References
Notes

Bibliography

External links
 Cottontown.org website
 Spinningtheweb.org website

Cotton mills
Textile mills in the Metropolitan Borough of Oldham
Textile mills completed in the 18th century
Former textile mills in the United Kingdom
Industrial Revolution in England
Demolished buildings and structures in Greater Manchester
Demolished manufacturing buildings and structures
Buildings and structures demolished in the 19th century